PPPPPP is a Japanese musical manga series written and illustrated by Mapollo 3. It was serialized in Shueisha's Weekly Shōnen Jump from September 2021 to February 2023, with its chapters collected into six tankōbon volumes as of January 2023. The manga has been licensed for English release in North America by Viz Media.

Synopsis 
Lucky Otogami is one of seven children who all love the piano. However, after a divorce, Lucky was left with only his mother while his father took his siblings. They became the prodigies known as the "Otogami Sextuplet Pianists", while Lucky was forced to live an abusive life in a relative's home after his mother fell into a coma. When his mother wakes up, he believes everything is right with the world, until he discovers she only has one year to live. Lucky decides to become a professional pianist so his mother can see him perform with his siblings.

Publication 
Written and illustrated by Mapollo 3, PPPPPP was serialized in Shueisha's shōnen manga magazine Weekly Shōnen Jump from September 18, 2021, to February 27, 2023. Shueisha has collected its chapters into individual tankōbon volumes. The first volume was released on January 4, 2022. As of January 4, 2023, six volumes have been released.

PPPPPP has been licensed for simultaneous publication in North America as it is released in Japan, with its chapters being digitally launched by Viz Media on its Shonen Jump website. Shueisha also simulpublishes the series in English for free on the Manga Plus app and website.

Volume list

Chapters not yet in tankōbon format 
These chapters have yet to be published in a tankōbon volume.

Reception 
Reviewing the first chapter of PPPPPP, Steven Blackburn of Screen Rant wrote that the conflicts seen in the manga are characteristic of successful shōnen series like Yūki Tabata's Black Clover and Masashi Kishimoto's Naruto, while commenting that there are other factors that "further hint at PPPPPPs likelihood of success", such as the incorporation of supernatural elements; Blackburn also stated, "In true shōnen-like fashion, this new [Weekly] Shōnen Jump manga doesn't rely on the reader's imagination to capture the power of music. Maporo 3-Gō makes it so that a moving melody can cause people to have visions."

The series was nominated for the 2022 Next Manga Award in the print manga category and placed 5th out of 50 nominees. The series was ranked tenth in the Nationwide Bookstore Employees' Recommended Comics of 2023.

References

External links 
  
 
 PPPPPP on Manga Plus
 

2021 manga
Music in anime and manga
Shōnen manga
Shueisha manga
Viz Media manga